Samangan University is located in  Samangan province, northern Afghanistan.

Institution of higher education, non-profit, non-governmental Samangan in 1384 after obtaining the necessary license, started its activity with the cooperation and support of the Ministry of Science, Research and Technology (and other organizations related) and systematic planning and effort boarding responsible institution, the Learn increase in per capita space used for educational, academic support facilities, textbooks and teaching aids, books Institute to achieve higher goals in the coming years is expected.

See also 
List of universities in Afghanistan

References

Universities in Afghanistan
University